Rineloricaria heteroptera is a species of catfish in the family Loricariidae. It is native to South America, where it is known from forest creeks in the Amazon River basin near Manaus in Brazil. The species reaches 13.3 cm (5.2 inches) in standard length and is believed to be a facultative air-breather.

References 

Loricariini
Fish described in 1976
Catfish of South America
Fish of Brazil
Fish of the Amazon basin